South Central Timor Regency is a regency in East Nusa Tenggara province of Indonesia. Established in 1958,
the regency has its seat (capital) in the town of Soe. It covers an area of 3,955.36 km2 and had a population of 440,470 at the 2010 Census and 455,410 at the 2020 Census; the official estimate as at mid 2021 was 457,958.

Mount Mutis, the highest mountain in the province of East Nusa Tenggara, is in the northern part of the regency. International visitors have noted that the region is rich in bird life and so is a good site for birdwatching.

The local economy in the area is poor and underdeveloped. Subsistence agriculture is the main economic activity in many villages.  In addition, when opportunities are available, some local village communities sometimes undertake unregulated mining or other resource-based activities.  For example, in the Kolbano Beach area south of Soe, there is a local industry in the collection of coloured stones.  The stones, which come in a range of attractive shapes and sizes, are sold to local companies.  The companies in turn export the stones to countries such as Australia, China, Malaysia, Singapore and elsewhere.  Sacks of stones sell (mid-2012) for between Rp 10,000 to Rp 25,000 (about US$1.00 to US$2.50). Local villagers are reported to be able to earn around Rp 50,000 (US$5) per day collecting stones although there are complaints that the prices paid to workers who collect the stones are too low.

However, there are concerns amongst some local community groups, such as the Molo people in the Mount Mutis Sanctuary, about the environmental impacts of mining in the area.  There has been social resistance, for example, to the activities of mining firms conducting marble quarrying. Partly as a result of the local resistance, marble mining firms abandoned their work in the area in 2010.

Administration 
The regency is divided into thirty-two districts (kecamatan), tabulated below with their areas and their populations at the 2010 Census and the 2020 Census, together with the official estimates as at mid 2021. The table also includes the locations of the district administrative centres, the number of villages (rural desa and urban kelurahan) in each district, and its post code.

Notes: (a) except the two desa (villages) of Bonleu and Tune (which had a post code of 85561). (b) except the desa (village) of Mnelalete (which had a post code of 85514.

References 

Regencies of East Nusa Tenggara